Volodymyr Yevhenovych Kostevych (born 23 October 1992) is a Ukrainian professional football defender who currently plays for Dynamo Kyiv.

Career
Kostevych is the product of the UFK Lviv Sportive School System. His first trainer was Oleksandr Voytyuk. In 2010, he signed a contract with FC Karpaty. Kostevych made his debut for FC Karpaty in a match against FC Chornomorets Odesa on 19 November 2011 in the Ukrainian Premier League.

Career statistics

Club

1 Including Ukrainian Super Cup and Polish SuperCup.

References

External links
 
 
 

1992 births
Living people
Ukrainian footballers
Ukraine under-21 international footballers
FC Karpaty Lviv players
FC Karpaty-2 Lviv players
Lech Poznań players
Lech Poznań II players
FC Dynamo Kyiv players
FC Rukh Lviv players
Ukrainian Premier League players
Ukrainian Second League players
II liga players
III liga players
Association football defenders
Ekstraklasa players
Expatriate footballers in Poland
Ukrainian expatriate sportspeople in Poland
Ukrainian expatriate footballers
Sportspeople from Lviv Oblast